Reeds Crossing is a former settlement in Spring Township, Boone County, Illinois, United States. Reeds Crossing was south of Belvidere and north of Herbert.

References

Geography of Boone County, Illinois
Ghost towns in Illinois